Lago di Ceresole is an artificial lake in the Province of Turin, Piedmont, northern Italy. The lake was created in 1925-1931 when A.E.M. (now Iren), Turin's electricity authority, built a dam with a hydroelectric plant. The site is located in what is now the comune of Ceresole Reale.

References 

Lakes of Piedmont
Reservoirs in Italy